Ian Winter (born 31 March 1941) is an Australian sailor. He competed in the Flying Dutchman event at the 1964 Summer Olympics.

References

External links
 

1941 births
Living people
Australian male sailors (sport)
Olympic sailors of Australia
Sailors at the 1964 Summer Olympics – Flying Dutchman
Place of birth missing (living people)